The Royal Squadron  originally known as the Royal Flotilla  was an ad hoc  naval formation of the British Royal Navy assembled for official visits and travel by sea by the British monarch.  The squadron was commanded by the Flag Officer, Royal Yachts from 1660 to 1997.

History
The Royal Squadron originally known as the Royal Flotilla  was an ad hoc naval squadron formed when the Monarch or other members of the royal family are embarked on any travel by sea for official visits. From 1660 until 1884 the squadron/flotilla when assembled was commanded by officers of various rank from Captain of the Fleet to Admiral of the Fleet. From the end of the nineteenth century until the late twentieth century the Flag Officer, Royal Yachts was responsible for command of the squadron when one is formed. He temporarily exercised tactical control over Royal Navy, Commonwealth and foreign warships and Royal Fleet Auxiliary that formed the Royal Squadron.

Flag Officer commanding

See also
 Royal Yacht Squadron

References

Footnotes

Sources
 Hansard (1994) "Flag Officer Royal Yachts, vol 236 cc171-2W". hansard.millbanksystems.com. Hansard.
 Naval History Society (1983) "The Royal Yacht Britannia: Naval Historical Review". www.navyhistory.org.au.
  Winfield, Rif (2008). British Warships in the Age of Sail, 1793-1817: Design, Construction, Careers and Fates. Barnsley, England: Seaforth Publishing. .

Royal Navy squadrons
British royal family
Military units and formations established in 1660
Military units and formations disestablished in 1997